OutThere magazine is a luxury travel magazine and an independent media brand, founded in 2010 by Uwern Jong and Martin Perry. OutThere's content is distributed across a number of platforms, primarily its quarterly printed magazine and also on its website and social channels.

Content and distribution 
OutThere is published quarterly by Out There Publishing in the United Kingdom and includes luxury travel reviews, news, features and style. OutThere is also online. Its content is rooted in "diversity, discovery and discernment."

The magazine is considered an "essential resource for LGBTQ+ travellers" and as a publisher, a "material player in the advancement of LGBTQ rights". It was billed by the Gordon Institute of Business Science as a "leading luxury and experiential travel magazine for gay men."

The magazine also runs the Experientialist Awards and the LGBT+ Travel Symposium, an event series to educate travel brands to embrace diversity and be more welcoming of LGBTQ+ audiences. The series started in 2018 in Bangkok, Thailand with the backing of the Tourism Authority of Thailand (the publishers also run the government's Go Thai Be Free LGBTQ+ outreach ) and it was the first ever event of its kind in South East Asia. It also runs the event in Stockholm, Sweden.

OutThere is a media-partner and member of the International LGBTQ Travel Association. The magazine's Editor-in-Chief, Uwern Jong, serves on the board of the association, known as the "world's leading travel trade association for LGBTQ+ tourism."

Achievements/awards 
The magazine has won a number of notable, mainstream publishing awards:

In 2020, it was the recipient of the Professional Publishers Association's Independent Publishers Award's, inaugural "Diversity Initiative of the Year" award, alongside Vogue. (and nominated in 4 other categories, including Brand of the Year). The awards are billed as the "magazine Oscars."

It also won the 2020 Campaign magazine Publishing Awards for "Editorial Leader of the Year: Consumer Publishing" (and nominated for Brand of the Year and Business Leader of the Year) against and alongside some of the UK's biggest publishing brands.

In 2018, it won the Travel Media Awards (billed by the Sunday Times as one of two of the "most prestigious awards in travel journalism") for "Consumer Publication of the Year: Online" against notable and well established media, the BBC, Lonely Planet, The Daily Telegraph.

In 2013 it took the Professional Publishers Association Independent Publishers Award for Relaunch of the Year.

References 

LGBT-related magazines published in the United Kingdom